This is a formatted table of Parks in Bowling Green, Kentucky.

External links
 Bowling Green Parks & Recreation

Bowling Green, Kentucky
Protected areas of Warren County, Kentucky
Parks in Kentucky
Tourist attractions in Bowling Green, Kentucky